Oorukichina Maata is a 1981 Telugu-language drama film written and directed by  M. Balayya starring Chiranjeevi, Sudhakar, Madhavi, and Kavitha. The film was remade in Tamil as Oorum Uravum (1982) starring Sivaji Ganesan. The film won two Nandi Awards.

Cast
 Chiranjeevi as Ramudu	
 Sudhakar as Koti
 Madhavi as Roopa
 Kavitha as Sita
 Narayan Rao		
 Kanta Rao as Pratap Rao
 Giribabu		
 Srilakshmi		
 Raavi Kondala Rao	as priest	
 Mada Venkateswara Rao as Daivadheenam
 Vankayala Satyanarayana

Soundtrack
 "Aadindhi Ooru", singers S.P. Balu, P.Susheela, lyricist C. Narayana Reddy
 "Choopullo Chuttesi", singers: S.P. Balu, P. Susheela. lyricist C. Narayana Reddy
 "Horugalilo", lyricist C. Narayana Reddy
 "Kodi Koose Podde Poddu", lyricist C. Narayana Reddy
 "Pairagali Paita Laguthunte",  singers S.P. Balu, P. Susheela, lyricist Jaladi Rajarao
 "Vachi Poraa Rangaa", lyricist C. Narayana Reddy

Awards
Nandi Awards - 1981
Third Best Feature Film - Bronze - M. Balayya
Second Best Story Writer - M. Balayya

References

External links

1981 films
1980s Telugu-language films
Films scored by M. S. Viswanathan
Telugu films remade in other languages